The 2021 Broxbourne Borough Council election took place on 6 May 2021 to elect members of the Broxbourne Borough Council in Hertfordshire, England. One-third of the council was up for election, and the Conservatives maintained overall control of the council.

These seats were due to be contested in 2020 but were delayed by one year due to the COVID-19 pandemic.

Results summary

Council composition
Following the last election in 2019, the composition of the council was:

After the election, the composition of the council was:

Lab - Labour

Ward results

Incumbent councillors are denoted by an asterisk (*)

Broxbourne and Hoddesdon South

Cheshunt North

Cheshunt South and Theobalds

Flamstead End

Goffs Oak

Hoddesdon North

Hoddesdon Town and Rye Park

Rosedale and Bury Green

Waltham Cross

Wormley and Turnford

References

Broxbourne
2021
2020s in Hertfordshire